Ricardo Cruz may refer to:

 Ricardo Cruz (athlete) (born 1946), Salvadoran Olympic athlete
 Ricardo Cruz (Brazilian footballer), Brazilian football manager and former goalkeeper
 Ricardo Cruz (lawyer) (1943–1993), American lawyer
 Ricardo Cruz (singer) (born 1982), Brazilian singer
 Ricardo Cruz (Mexican footballer) (born 1997), Mexican football midfielder